Triosmium dodecacarbonyl is a chemical compound with the formula Os3(CO)12.  This yellow-colored metal carbonyl cluster is an important precursor to organo-osmium compounds.  Many of the advances in cluster chemistry have arisen from studies on derivatives of Os3(CO)12 and its lighter analogue Ru3(CO)12.

Structure and synthesis
The cluster has D3h symmetry, consisting of an equilateral triangle of Os atoms, each of which bears two axial and two equatorial CO ligands.  Each of the three osmium centers has an octahederal structure with four CO ligands and the other two osmium atoms. 

The Os–Os bond distance is  2.88 Â (288 pm).  Ru3(CO)12 has the same structure, whereas Fe3(CO)12 is different, with two bridging CO ligands resulting in C2v symmetry.

Os3(CO)12 is prepared by the direct reaction of OsO4 with carbon monoxide at 175 °C under high pressures:
 3 OsO4  +  24 CO  → Os3(CO)12  +  12 CO2
The yield is nearly quantitative.

Reactions
Many chemical reactions of Os3(CO)12 have been examined.  Direct reactions of ligands with the cluster often lead to complex product distributions. Os3(CO)12 converts to more labile derivatives such as Os3(CO)11(MeCN) and Os3(CO)10(MeCN)2 using Me3NO as a decarbonylating agent:  

Os3(CO)11(MeCN) reacts with a variety of even weakly basic ligands to form adducts.

Purging a solution of triosmium dodecacarbonyl in boiling octane (or similar inert solvent of similar boiling point) with H2 gives the dihydride Os3H2(CO)10:

Osmium pentacarbonyl is obtained by treating solid triosmium dodecacarbonyl with 200 atmospheres of carbon monoxide at 280-290 °C.

References

Organoosmium compounds
Carbonyl complexes
Osmium compounds